Bouvines is a commune and village in the Nord department in northern France. It is on the French-Belgian border between Lille and Tournai.

History

On 27 July 1214, the Battle of Bouvines was fought here between the forces of the French King Philip Augustus, who was resoundingly victorious, against a coalition, led by Holy Roman Emperor Otto IV and the English King John (who was not present at the battle).

Population

Heraldry

Notable residents
General Achille Pierre Deffontaines was born there.

See also
Communes of the Nord department

References

Communes of Nord (French department)
French Flanders